Converse, also known as the Pennsylvania RR Depot, is a historic train station located at Converse, Miami County, Indiana.  It was built in 1912, as a -story, brick building in the Bungalow / American Craftsman style. It is surrounded by a deep pent roof canopy on three sides. Above the pent roof canopy is a broad stuccoed gable.  It was built by the Pennsylvania Railroad and remained in use into the 1950s.

It was listed on the National Register of Historic Places in 1995 as the Converse Depot.

References

Former Pennsylvania Railroad stations
Railway stations on the National Register of Historic Places in Indiana
Railway stations in the United States opened in 1912
National Register of Historic Places in Miami County, Indiana
Transportation buildings and structures in Miami County, Indiana